Juan Gallardo Thurlow (born c. 1948) is a Mexican businessman.

Career
Gallardo Thurlow is a chairman of Grupo Embotelladoras Unidas (bottling), chairman of Mexico Fund Inc. (mutual fund), and vice chairman of Home Mart de México (retail trade). He is former chairman and CEO of Grupo Azucarero México (sugar mills).

Other directorships he has held: Caterpillar Inc.; NADRO, Grupo México (mining) and Lafarge (construction). Gallardo has been a director of Caterpillar since 1998. His worth is estimated at US$1.4 billion.

References 

Living people
Mexican billionaires
Mexican businesspeople
1948 births